Deborah Lee is the name of:
 Deb Lee, fictional character from the American TV series One Tree Hill
 Debbie Lee (born 1974), Australian rules footballer
 Deborah Lee (film producer) (1949-2007), film producer for Scenes of the Crime
 Deborah Lee (actress) (born 1951), Hong Kong actress, ex-wife of Patrick Tse